Of Sculptured Ivy and Stone Flowers is the second full-length studio album by the American death-doom band Novembers Doom, which was released in 1999. This album features an entirely different lineup from its predecessor, save for vocalist Paul Kuhr.

Track listing

Personnel
 Paul Kuhr - vocals
 Sasha Horn - drums
 Cathy Jo Hejna - vocals
 Mary Bielich - bass
 Eric Burnley - guitars

Additional personnel and staff
 Erik Kikke - guitars on "Forever with Unopened Eye"
 Mark Piotrowski - keyboards on "Before the Wind"
 Brian Griffin - producer, recording, engineering

References

1999 albums
Novembers Doom albums